George Henry may refer to:

 George Henry (baseball) (1863–1934), baseball player
 George Henry (painter) (1858–1943), Scottish painter
 George Morrison Reid Henry (1891–1983), entomologist and ornithologist
 George Stewart Henry (1871–1953), farmer, businessman and politician
 Bunky Henry (1944–2018), professional golfer
 Maungwudaus (1811-1888), went by the name George Henry

See also
 
 Henry George (disambiguation)